Aditya Babu  is a Telugu producer and actor who also works in Kannada films. He is the son of the late J. D. Sompalli, a producer.

Career
Aditya Babu was interested in acting since childhood, and went on to become an actor and also got into film production to nurture his skills and fulfil his passion to succeed as a filmmaker. He debuted as hero in a Kannada movie titled Anthu Inthu Preethi Banthu, directed by Veera Shankar. The female lead was Ramya. His first Telugu film as an actor was Chalaki.

Filmography

References

External links

Living people
1984 births
Telugu film producers
Film producers from Andhra Pradesh
Male actors in Telugu cinema
Indian male film actors